The PMB Road Classic was a one-day road cycling race held in South Africa in 2015. It was held as part of the 2015 UCI Africa Tour, as a 1.2-categorised race.

Winners

References

Cycle races in South Africa
2015 establishments in South Africa
Recurring sporting events established in 2015
2015 disestablishments in South Africa
Recurring sporting events disestablished in 2015
UCI Africa Tour races
Autumn events in South Africa